Sri Padma Charan Nayak is an eminent Gandhian, Columnist and anti-liquor activist of India. He was born on 30 January 1926 in Barakula village under patkura Police station of Kedrapada District in the state of Odisha, India. His parents were Sri Jogendra Naik and Smt Malati Naik. In his nineties, Sri Naik is currently the leading Milita Odisha Nisha Nibarana Abhijan (MONNA), an organization working to sensitize public to voice against the spread of liquor in the state of Odisha and in India. He studied Chemistry and graduated from Ravenshaw College (Now University) with a master's degree. He became a lecturer for some time before joining the Communist party as a Political Worker. He served as Journalist in Soviet Information Department. He quit the Communist Party and contested as an Independent candidate in 1961 from Rajnagar assembly constituency and got elected. Joined Praja Socialist Party in April 1965. His son is a Professor and daughter is a former Member of the Parliament from Odisha. He recently met Prime Minister Narendra Modi ji to demand prohibition across the country as per Mahatma Gandhi's wish where he said it would have been his first priority after India gained independence.

Nayak celebrated his 95th birthday in January 2021.

References

1926 births
Living people
People from Odisha
Ravenshaw University alumni
Indian activists
Anti-liquor activists